Alexander Altair Soares (born 30 August 1975) is a Brazilian former rower. He competed in the men's quadruple sculls event at the 1996 Summer Olympics.

References

External links
 

1975 births
Living people
Brazilian male rowers
Olympic rowers of Brazil
Rowers at the 1996 Summer Olympics
Sportspeople from Florianópolis
Pan American Games medalists in rowing
Pan American Games silver medalists for Brazil
Rowers at the 1999 Pan American Games
Rowers at the 2003 Pan American Games
Medalists at the 1999 Pan American Games